Ramesh Krishnan was the defending champion but lost in the first round to Patrick Baur.

Kelly Evernden won in the final 7–5, 6–1, 6–4 against Shuzo Matsuoka.

Seeds
A champion seed is indicated in bold text while text in italics indicates the round in which that seed was eliminated.

  Ramesh Krishnan (first round)
  Milan Šrejber (quarterfinals)
  Michiel Schapers (first round)
  Shuzo Matsuoka (final)
  Tobias Svantesson (quarterfinals)
  Danilo Marcelino (first round)
  Glenn Michibata (semifinals)
  Kelly Evernden (champion)

Draw

 NB: The Final was the best of 5 sets while all other rounds were the best of 3 sets.

Final

Section 1

Section 2

External links
 1989 BP National Championships draw

BP National Championships
1989 Grand Prix (tennis)